Thomas A. Cecchini (born December 9, 1944) is a former American football player and coach.  He played college football as an All-Big Ten Conference linebacker at the University of Michigan, and he held coaching positions with Xavier University, University of Iowa, and the Minnesota Vikings.  In two years as the head coach at Xavier, he compiled a record of 8–13–1.

Football player
Cecchini began his football career at Detroit's Pershing High School where he was selected as an all-city player in 1961.  

In the fall of 1962, Cecchini enrolled at the University of Michigan. As a sophomore, he started the first four games of the season as a two-way player at center and linebacker.  He was selected by the UPI was the Midwest Lineman of the Week for his performance against Michigan State on October 12, 1963.  One week later, he tore ligaments in his left knee in a game against Purdue and was lost to the team for the remainder of the 1963 season. 

After surgery on his knee, Cecchini returned to Michigan in 1964. He played 300 minutes, principally at linebacker, in Michigan's nine regular season games, helping the Wolverines to an 8-1 record and a Big Ten championship.  He was again selected by the UPI as the Midwest Lineman of the Week for his role in Michigan's 10-0 victory over Ohio State. At the end of the 1964 season he was selected by the Associated Press (AP) as a first-team linebacker on the 1964 All-Big Ten Conference football team.

In January 1965, Cecchini was voted by his teammates as captain of the 1965 Michigan Wolverines football team. He started all 10 games at linebacker for a 1965 team that saw its record drop to 4-6. At the end of the 1965 season, he was selected by both the AP and UPI as a second-team player on the 1965 All-Big Ten Conference football team.

After leaving Michigan, Cecchini played for the Ypsilanti Vikings of the Midwest Football League and was selected as a first-team, all-league linebacker in 1967.

Coaching career
After receiving his bachelor's degree from Michigan in 1966, he remained at Michigan as a member of Michigan's coaching staff. He also received a master's degree in education at Michigan.  In 1970, he was hired as the defensive line coach at Xavier University in Cincinnati, Ohio. He served as the head football coach at Xavier from 1972 to 1973.  At the end of the 1973 season, Xavier terminated its intercollegiate football program.  In January 1974, he was hired as an assistant football coach at the University of Iowa, where former Michigan head coach Bump Elliott was employed as the athletic director.  After seven seasons as an assistant coach at Iowa, he was hired as the defensive line coach for the Minnesota Vikings in March 1980.

Business career
In 1984, Cecchini quit coaching to form a computer document processing company and a software company.  In the mid-1990s, Cecchini's companies went out of business, and Cecchini filed for person bankruptcy. In September 1998, Cecchini was hired by Michigan athletic director Tom Goss as an associate athletic director at Michigan.  In 1999, Cecchini became embroiled in controversy.  Cecchini received a salary of $96,000 and bonuses of $12,800 at Michigan.  The Detroit News reported that Goss stated that Cecchini had been making about $200,000 a year, but an investigation by the newspaper showed he had been a $38,400 employee of a Minnesota video technology company when he was hired by Goss.  The News investigation also criticized Goss for following Cecchini's advice concerning the installation of new electronic scoreboards at Michigan Stadium and Crisler Arena.

Head coaching record

References

1944 births
Living people
Iowa Hawkeyes football coaches
Michigan Wolverines football players
Midwest Football League (1962–1978) players
Minnesota Vikings coaches
Xavier Musketeers football coaches
Pershing High School alumni
Players of American football from Detroit
Educators from Michigan